Jamie Loeb (born March 8, 1995) is an American tennis player.

She has career-high WTA rankings of 132 in singles, achieved in February 2018, and 120 in doubles, achieved in July 2018. Loeb has won nine singles and nine doubles titles on the ITF Women's Circuit.

She won the New York State high-school title as a sophomore. Loeb won the singles and doubles U18s championships at the 2012 USTA National Winter Championship, and won the doubles at the 2013 USTA International Spring Championship. She attended the University of North Carolina for her freshman and sophomore years (2013–15), and won the singles NCAA Championship in 2015.

Biography
Born in Bronxville, New York, Loeb was raised in Ossining, New York. Her parents are Jerry, who owns a butcher business, and Susan Loeb, who is a substitute teacher. She is the youngest of four siblings, and is Jewish. For middle school, she attended the Anne M. Dorner Middle School, while playing high school tennis.

Tennis career
Her mother, a tennis instructor, was her first coach. She began hitting tennis balls at Club Fit in Briarcliff at age five, and then at the Hardscrabble Club in Brewster at age seven, and by the age of 11, she was competing in national tournaments. She won a New York State title for Ossining High School as a sophomore, following in the footsteps of her sister Jenna who had won three. She finished her high school studies on-line.

She trained at the John McEnroe Tennis Academy at Randall’s Island where on occasion she hit with McEnroe.

Loeb won the singles and doubles 18s championships at the 2012 USTA National Winter Championship, won the doubles and finished runner-up in singles at the 2013 USTA International Spring Championship, and was a quarterfinalist at the 2013 Wimbledon Juniors.

Loeb attended the University of North Carolina for her freshman and sophomore years (2013–15), studying sports administration. She played tennis for the North Carolina Tar Heels, and became the first freshman in close to 30 years to win both the Riviera/ITA Women's All-American Championship (defeating Carol Zhao of Stanford in the final of the 2015 NCAA Division I Tennis Championships; making her the NCAA Women's Singles Tennis National Champion) and the USTA/ITA National Indoor Intercollegiate Championship. She was also the first singles national champion in UNC women's tennis history. After she won the national championship, the Village and Town of Ossining declared August 3 to be Jamie Loeb Day. In both her freshman and her sophomore seasons, she was named Atlantic Coast Conference (ACC) Player of the Year and ITA All American.

She then decided to compete in tennis as a professional, leaving UNC with an 84–9 career-record in singles competition.

Loeb won her biggest title to date at the 2015 Stockton Challenger in the doubles event, partnering Sanaz Marand. She received a wildcard for the 2015 US Open and played fourth seed Caroline Wozniacki in the first round, losing in straight sets. Loeb won two singles titles in 2016 at $25k tournaments in Surprise, Arizona, and El Paso, Texas.

Grand Slam performance timelines

Singles

Doubles

WTA 125 tournament finals

Singles: 1 (runner-up)

Doubles: 2 (2 runner-ups)

ITF Circuit finals

Singles: 14 (10 titles, 4 runner–ups)

Doubles: 26 (10 titles, 16 runner–ups)

See also
 2015 NCAA Division I Tennis Championships
 List of select Jewish tennis players

Notes

References

External links
 
 
 North Carolina Tar Heels bio
 Interview with Tennis Served Fresh

American female tennis players
Jewish tennis players
Jewish American sportspeople
1995 births
Living people
People from Bronxville, New York
People from Ossining, New York
North Carolina Tar Heels women's tennis players
21st-century American Jews
21st-century American women
Tennis people from New York (state)